Heinsia is a small genus of flowering shrubs or small trees in the family Rubiaceae. They are native to tropical Africa. The genus was first formally named in 1830 by Augustin Pyramus de Candolle.

Species
, the following five species are accepted in Plants of the World Online:
Heinsia bussei Verdc.
Heinsia crinita (Wennberg) G.Taylor
Heinsia mozambicensis (Verdc.) J.E.Burrows & S.M.Burrows
Heinsia myrmoecia (K.Schum.) N.Hallé
Heinsia zanzibarica (Bojer) Verdc.

References

Rubiaceae genera
Flora of Africa
Mussaendeae